Porz (Rhein) is a railway station situated at Porz, Cologne in the German state of North Rhine-Westphalia on the Sieg and East Rhine Railways. It is served by the S12 line of the Rhine-Ruhr S-Bahn. It is classified by Deutsche Bahn as a category 4 station.

References 

Railway stations in North Rhine-Westphalia
S12 (Rhine-Ruhr S-Bahn)
Railway stations in Cologne
Rhine-Ruhr S-Bahn stations
Porz